Batrachedra litterata is a species of moth in the family Batrachedridae. It is endemic to New Zealand and has been collected in the North and South Islands. This species has been reared on the fern species Blechnum chambersii. Adults are on the wing in November and December.

Taxonomy
This species was first described in 1928 by Alfred Philpott from specimens collected by Dr A. J. Turner in Greymouth in February. George Hudson discussed and illustrated this species both in his 1939 book A supplement to the butterflies and moths of New Zealand. The holotype specimen is held at the New Zealand Arthropod Collection.

Description

Philpott described this species as follows:

Distribution
This species is endemic to New Zealand. Along with its type locality of Greymouth, this species has also been collected in Claverley, in Canterbury as well as in the Waitākere Ranges.

Behaviour 
The adults of this species are on the wing in November and December.

Host 

B. litterata have been reared on the fern species Blechnum chambersii.

References

Batrachedridae
Moths of New Zealand
Moths described in 1928
Endemic fauna of New Zealand
Taxa named by Alfred Philpott
Endemic moths of New Zealand